Mormon literature is generally considered to have begun a few years before the March 1830 publication of the Book of Mormon. Since then, Mormon literature has grown to include more scripture, as well as histories, fiction, biographies, poetry, hymns, drama and other forms.

See also

 A Believing People
 Association for Mormon Letters
AML Awards
 Bloggernacle
 Richard H. Cracroft
 Eugene England
 Mormon cinema
 Mormon fiction
 Mormon poetry
 List of films of The Church of Jesus Christ of Latter-day Saints
 List of pageants of The Church of Jesus Christ of Latter-day Saints
 List of Mormon Cartoonists
 Mormon art
 Mormon folk music
 Mormon music
 A Motley Vision
 Whitney Awards

References 
 England, Eugene. "Mormon Literature: Progress and Prospects" in David J. Whittaker, ed., Mormon Americana: A Guide to Sources and Collections in the United States. (Provo, Utah: BYU Studies, 1995)

External links
 MLCA database
 Mormon literature website by Gideon Burton at Brigham Young University

 Literature